Chlerogas is a genus of bees belonging to the family Halictidae.

The species of this genus are found in Southern America.

Species:

Chlerogas araguaensis 
Chlerogas aterrimus 
Chlerogas boliviensis 
Chlerogas chlerogas 
Chlerogas columbiensis 
Chlerogas cooperi 
Chlerogas cyaneus 
Chlerogas hirsutipennis 
Chlerogas nephos 
Chlerogas tiara 
Chlerogas townesi

References

Halictidae